Politics of Ghana takes place in a framework of a presidential representative democratic republic, whereby the President of Ghana is both head of state and head of government, and of a two party system. The seat of government is at Golden Jubilee House. Executive power is exercised by the government. Legislative power is vested in both the government and Parliament. The judiciary is independent of the executive and the legislature.

The constitution that established the Fourth Republic provided a basic charter for republican democratic government. It declares Ghana to be a unitary republic with sovereignty residing in the Ghanaian people. Intended to prevent future coups, dictatorial government, and one-party states, it is designed to establish the concept of powersharing. The document reflects lessons learned from the abrogated constitutions of 1957, 1960,69, and 1979, and incorporates provisions and institutions drawn from British and American constitutional models. One controversial provision of the Constitution indemnifies members and appointees of the Provisional National Defence Council (PNDC) from liability for any official act or omission during the years of PNDC rule. The Constitution calls for a system of checks and balances, with power shared between a president, a unicameral parliament, a council of state, and an independent judiciary.

Executive branch

|President
|Nana Akufo-Addo
|New Patriotic Party
|7 January 2017
|-
|Vice-President
|Mahamudu Bawumia
|New Patriotic Party
|7 January 2017
|}
Nana Akufo-Addo is established in the Office of the Presidency, together with his Council of State. The president is head of state, head of government, and commander in chief of the armed forces. He also appoints the vice president. According to the Constitution, more than half of the presidentially appointed ministers of state must be appointed from among members of Parliament.

The outcome of the December 2012 elections, in which John Dramani Mahama was declared President by the Ghana Electoral Commission, was challenged by Nana Akufo-Addo, Mahamudu Bawumia and Jake Obetsebi-Lamptey at the Supreme Court of Ghana, which came out with the verdict that Mahama legally won the 2012 presidential election

This precedent which was set by  Nana Akufo-Addo and the NPP party in 2012 was followed by John Dramani Mahama the then president, and now opposition leader and the NDC party when they petition the Highest Court of the Land to overturn the election victory of  Nana Akufo-Addo and the NPP party on the grounds that the victory was illegal.

Legislative branch
Legislative functions are vested in Parliament, which consists of a unicameral 275-member body plus the Speaker. To become law, legislation must have the assent of the president, who has a qualified veto over all bills except those to which a vote of urgency is attached.

Members are elected for a four-year term in single-seat constituencies by simple plurality vote.  As it is predicted by Duverger's law, the voting system has encouraged Ghanaian politics into a two-party system, which means that there are two dominant political parties, with extreme difficulty for anybody to achieve electoral success under the banner of any other party.  Elections have been held every four years since 1992.  Presidential and parliamentary elections are held alongside each other, generally on 7 December.

Political parties and elections

Presidential elections

Parliamentary elections

History

Recent political developments 

Nana Akufo-Addo, the ruling party candidate, was defeated in a very close election by John Atta Mills of the National Democratic Congress (NDC) following the Ghanaian presidential election, 2008. Mills died of natural causes and was succeeded by vice-president John Dramani Mahama on 24 July 2012.

Following the Ghanaian presidential election, 2012, John Dramani Mahama became President-elect and was inaugurated on 7 January 2013. Ghana was a stable democracy.

As a result of the Ghanaian presidential election, 2016, Nana Akufo-Addo became President-elect and was inaugurated as the fifth President of the Fourth Republic of Ghana and eighth President of Ghana on 7 January 2017. In December 2020, President Nana Akufo-Addo was re-elected after a tightly contested election.

Judicial branch

The structure and the power of the judiciary are independent of the two other branches of government. The Judiciary of Ghana is responsible for interpreting, applying and enforcing the laws of Ghana, and exist to settle legal conflicts fairly and in a more competent way. The Supreme Court of Ghana has broad powers of judicial review. It is authorized by the Constitution to rule on the constitutionality of any legislation or executive action at the request of any aggrieved citizen. The hierarchy of courts derives largely from British juridical forms. The courts have jurisdiction over all civil and criminal matters. They include the Superior Courts of Judicature, established under the 1992 Constitution, and the Inferior Courts, established by Parliament. The Superior Courts are, from highest to lowest, the Supreme Court of Ghana, the Court of Appeal, the High Court of Justice, and the ten Regional Tribunals.  The Inferior Courts, since the Courts Act 2002, include the Circuit Courts, the Magistrate Courts, and special courts such as the Juvenile Courts.

In 2007, Georgina Wood became the first ever female chief justice of the Ghanaian Supreme Court.

Administrative divisions

Ghana is divided into sixteen regions: Ashanti, Brong-Ahafo, Central, Eastern, Greater Accra, Northern, Upper East, Upper West, Volta, Oti Region, Western North Region, North East Region, Ahafo Region, Savannah Region, Bono East Region and Western Region.

International organization participation
Ghana is member of ACP, AfDB, AU, C, ECOWAS, FAO, G-24, G-77, IAEA, IBRD, ICAO, ICC, ICCt, ICFTU, ICRM, IDA, IFAD, IFC, IFRCS, ILO, IMF, IMO, Interpol, IOC, IOM (observer), ISO, ITU, MIGA, MINURSO, MONUC, NAM, OAS (observer), ONUB, OPCW, UN, UNAMSIL, UNCTAD, UNESCO, UNIDO, UNIFIL, UNITAR, UNMEE, UNMIK, UNMIL, UNOCI, UPU, WCL, WFTU, WHO, WIPO, WMO, WToO, WTrO.

See also
 Government of Ghana

References

External links
 Global Integrity Report: Ghana has information on Ghana's anti-corruption efforts*
 Latest Political News From Ghana